Connecticut's 48th House of Representatives district elects one member of the Connecticut House of Representatives. It encompasses parts of the towns of Colchester, Windham, Lebanon, and Mansfield. It has been represented by Democrat Brian Smith since 2020.

Recent elections

2020

2018

2016

2014

2012

References

48